George Henry Christopher (December 9, 1888 – January 23, 1959) was a Democratic representative from Missouri's 6th congressional district from January 3, 1949, to January 3, 1951, and from the Missouri's 4th congressional district from January 3, 1955, until his death from a heart attack on January 23, 1959. Christopher did not sign the 1956 Southern Manifesto and voted in favor of the Civil Rights Act of 1957.

He was born on a farm in Bates County, Missouri, near Butler, Missouri.  He graduated from Hill's Business College, Sedalia, Missouri, in 1907.  He lived on a farm in Calhoun County, Illinois, and Craig County, Oklahoma, before returning to Missouri.

He is buried in Oak Hill Cemetery in Butler.

See also
 List of United States Congress members who died in office (1950–99)

References

1888 births
1959 deaths
Farmers from Missouri
People from Bates County, Missouri
Democratic Party members of the United States House of Representatives from Missouri
20th-century American politicians